Kwabena Amoako Akoanor (6 June 1982 - 9 June 2022) also known as Sonni Balli was a Ghanaian Dancehall artiste.

Early life
He started doing music at an early age of 17 without his parent approval as a result of being the first born of three siblings, his parent wanted him to become a doctor but he decided to do music.

Career
At an early age, he teamed up with a music producer called Nana King to come out with the albums Kotoho and Abrabo, he later was part of a group called G-Life, as result of his good works he inspired other acts like Samini, Shatta Wale and more. He also featured artist like Slim Buster, Marry Agyapong and Lord Kenya.

Death
It was alleged that he died as a result of cardiac arrest.

Discography

 Elaale
 Love My Ex
 The Truth (Kulcha Riddim)
 Gimme

References

1982 births
2022 deaths
21st-century Ghanaian male singers
Dancehall singers